is the 44th single by J-pop girl group Morning Musume. It is the last single to feature Eri Kamei, Junjun and Linlin prior to their graduation. The single was released in four editions: Limited A, B and C, and normal. The limited editions each came with a different DVD. The limited edition releases, as well as the first press of the normal edition, also came with an event serial number card. The Single V was released on November 24, 2010. The single debuted at #6 on the weekly Oricon charts, selling a reported total of 42,405 copies in the first week.

Track listing

Members
 5th generation: Ai Takahashi, Risa Niigaki
 6th generation: Eri Kamei , Sayumi Michishige, Reina Tanaka
 8th generation: Aika Mitsui, Junjun , Linlin 

Onna to Otoko no Lullaby Game

Main Voc: Ai Takahashi, Reina Tanaka

Center Voc: Risa Niigaki, Eri Kamei

Minor Voc: Sayumi Michishige, Aika Mitsui, Junjun, Linlin

Aisaresugiru Koto wa Nai no yo

Main Voc: Ai Takahashi, Reina Tanaka

Center Voc: Risa Niigaki, Eri Kamei, Sayumi Michishige, Aika Mitsui, Junjun,  Linlin

References

2010 singles
Japanese-language songs
Morning Musume songs
Song recordings produced by Tsunku
Songs written by Tsunku
Zetima Records singles
2010 songs
Japanese synth-pop songs
Dance-pop songs